

Dinosaurs
 Dinosaur bones are discovered in Connecticut's red sandstones. The bones are so small that they were originally believed to be human remains. Richard Lull later properly identified them as dinosaurian and proposed that these fossils may have belonged to a coelurosaur. Later work by Peter Galton in 1976 determined that these fossils were actually from a prosauropod.

References

1820s in paleontology
Paleontology